Groschen (from  "thick",  via  Old Czech  ) a (sometimes colloquial) name for various coins, especially a silver coin used in various states of the  Holy Roman Empire and other parts of Europe. The word is borrowed from the late Latin  description of a tornose, a grossus denarius Turnosus, in English the "thick denarius of Tours". Groschen was frequently abbreviated in old documents to gl, whereby the second letter was not an l (12th letter of the alphabet), but an abbreviation symbol; later it was written as Gr or g.

Names and etymology

"thick penny", whence Old French , Italian , Middle High German , Low German and Dutch  and English groat. In the 14th century, it appeared as Old Czech  , whence Modern German .

Names in other modern European languages include:
 
 Church Slavonic-derived languages: Bulgarian, Macedonian, Russian and Serbo-Croatian ,  Belarusian and Ukrainian:  
 
 
 
 
 
 
 
 
 

History

Middle Ages 

Historically it was equal to between several and a dozen .

In the German-speaking world, the groschen was usually worth 12 pfennigs; many regional (small) groschen e.g. Neugroschen, Groten (plural: Grote) in northern Germany, English: groat, Mariengroschen, Grösch(e)l were worth between 2½ and 10 pfennigs. The later  Kreuzer, a coin worth 4 pfennigs arose from the linguistic abbreviation of the small Kreuzgroschen.

The groschen was first introduced into the Holy Roman Empire in 1271 by Duke Meinhard II of Tyrol in Merano. It was originally a solid coin of pure silver, larger than the denarius which was no longer valid. In essence, it took the place of a variety of the older pfennigs, whose silver purity had inflated their value over the centuries. According to one source, the city of Trier is said to have struck groschen-like, thick pfennigs as early as 1104, which were then followed in 1300 by the Bohemian groschen from Kuttenberg. The new coin soon inspired other 'mint lords' (Münzherren) and was given, not least for reasons of economic necessity, a higher face value in the Early Renaissance period. Upper Italian coins of multiple pfennig value in the High Middle Ages were similarly called Grossini (cf. also Schilling).

The 1286 Tyrolean example (above right) weighs , it is marked with ME IN AR DVS and a Double Cross (obverse), and with DUX TIROL and the Eagle of Tyrol (reverse).

In 1328 Emperor Louis IV, the Bavarian, authorised Count Adolf VI of Berg to mint torneses in Wipperfürth. The oldest groschen in the area that is now modern Germany were minted there until 1346.

Following the example of the Tours Grossus, the Prague groschen or groš was minted in Kuttenberg and, around 1338/1339, the Meissen groschen in Freiburg's National Mint in the Margraviate of Meissen. Both coins gained national importance and had a strong influence on German coinage. Groschen valued at 12 pfennigs were common. The Polish groschen or grosz was worth only half as much – 6 pfennigs – and was commonly used in Silesia as a grosch(e)l or gresch(e)l worth just  to 3 pfennigs.

The 'prince's groschen' (Fürstengroschen) set a record in terms of the devaluation of the Meissen groschen. When this groschen was introduced in March 1393, its value was 23  of a Rhenish guilder. In 1406, the devaluation of these coins reached its peak: 53 groschen were now equal to 1 Rhenish guilder.

The groschen was minted during the Middle Ages in the following areas:
 Tirol (from 1271)
 England (from 1279, the groat)
 Bohemia (from 1300, the Prague groschen, later adopted by most of the Central European countries)
 Poland (from 1367, the Cracow ,  of silver, an equivalent of 12 denarii)
 Moldavia (from the reign of Petru I, 1375–1391)
The type was also minted during various times in the Duchy of Luxembourg, such as the 22 millimetre  gros produced from 1418 to 1425 under John III the Pitiless, Duke of Bavaria, bearing slightly varying inscriptions of "IOAH DVX BAVAR Z FILIVS" on the obverse, and "MONE NOVA LUCE BURS" on the reverse.

Early Modern period 

In Germany, the name  (both singular and plural) replaced  as the common name for a 12  coin. Silesia and Bohemia introduced the white groschen (Weissgroschen) in 1821 at the same time as Prussia. Frederick William III of Prussia could not yet decide on the consistent introduction of the decimal system. In order to be able to distinguish his new pfennig' from the old ones, they were called Pfenninge.

The last German Kurantgroschen (regarding the simple face value) were issued in the Kingdom of Saxony in 1827 and 1828, and in the Duchy of Saxe-Coburg and Gotha in 1837 based on a monetary standard, the Konventionsfuß, of the state, according to which the silver contained in 320 groschen was equal to the weight of a Cologne Mark (233.856 grammes).

An exception in relation to the value of thaler coins is the series of 'butterfly coins' (Schmetterlingsmünzen) in the Electorate of Saxony. All these coins only show their value in groschen; the usual abbreviation for groschen used in the everyday correspondence being used for the denomination on the coins. Likewise, the abbreviation for groschen used in the written word was stamped on the Electoral Saxon golden Reichsgulden zu 21 Groschen of 1584. In this case, it was probably intended to express the fact that it is a coin of account (Rechnungsmünze). Another special case is the Kipperthaler, on which the value in groschen (or Kreuzer) is also stamped to circumvent the Imperial Minting Ordinance (Reichsmünzordnung). Also interesting are thalers, which were minted in denominations of 28 and 24 groschen without differences in design and size. For example, the 24 groschen Hosenbandtaler were also coins of account, which is sometimes not recognized.

Following German unification and decimalisation, with 100 pfennigs to the mark, the groschen was replaced by the 10  coin and  remained a nickname for the 10  coin until the introduction of the euro. For the same reason, the name  (sixer) remained in use regionally for the half- coin, 5 s.

There is a Beethoven rondo for piano, opus 129 (1795) entitled "" (literally "The Rage Over the Lost Groschen", but known as "Rage Over a Lost Penny").

Modern currencies

In recent times, the name was used by three currencies in circulation:
In Turkey, a kuruş is a 1/100 part of lira.

Likewise, in Germany groschen remained a slang term for the 10 pfennig coin, thus a  part both of the (West German) Deutsche Mark and the East German mark. The word has lost popularity with the introduction of the euro, although it can still be heard on occasion, especially from older people.

The Ukrainian and Belarusian common word for money, derives from the word "grosh."

In Palestine during the British Mandate, a grush was a coin with a hole in it, valued at  part of a pound (ten mils).  It was named after an Ottoman coin.  When the pound was replaced by the lira after Israeli statehood in 1948, the name was transferred to a coin (no longer with a hole) worth  of a lira (ten perutot, later one agora). The name persisted for a while after the lira was replaced by the shekel in 1980 (one new agora, worth ten old agorot), but it gradually lost its standing as the name of a certain coin. Now it is slang for a very small value.
  

Legacy 
In the Russian language there exists a sarcastic expression "a grosh is the price" that is used as a label for things that are not worth anything.

See also

General 
 Coinage of Saxony
 Groat (coin)
 , The Threepenny Opera
 
 
 Venetian grosso
 Kraków

Types of groschen
 Apfelgroschen (orb groschen)
 Bartgroschen (beard groschen)
 Fürstengroschen (prince's groschen)
 Guldengroschen (guilder groschen)
 Helmgroschen (helmet groschen)
 Horngroschen (horn groschen)
 Judenkopfgroschen (Jew's head groschen)
 Margarethengroschen (Margaret's groschen)
 Neugroschen (new groschen)
 Prague groschen
 Schildgroschen (shield groschen)
 Hessian Schildgroschen (Hessian shield groschen)
 Schwertgroschen (sword groschen)
 Silbergroschen (silver groschen)
 Zinsgroschen (interest groschen)

References 

Currencies of Germany
Currencies of Poland
Medieval currencies
Early Modern currencies
Modern obsolete currencies
Coins of the Holy Roman Empire